Ahmed El-Zend (الزند) is a Judge at the Egyptian Ministry of Justice and was appointed to be the Minister of Justice in Egypt on 20 May 2015. He was dismissed from the post on 13 March 2016.

El-Zend CJ was born in Tanta in 1946 and became a public prosecutor after graduating obtaining a degree in Islamic law from Al-Azhar University, Faculty of Sharia and Law in 1970. His Honor was elected to be the chief of the Egyptian Judges' Club in 2009 and had occupied this position until he became the Egyptian Minister of Justice.

References

Living people
20th-century Egyptian lawyers
Justice ministers of Egypt
1946 births
People from Tanta
Al-Azhar University alumni
21st-century Egyptian judges